The Russian National Freestyle  Wrestling Championships 2016 were held in Yakutsk, Sakha-Yakutia, Russia in the Triumph Arena from 27 to 29 May 2016.

Incident between Lebedev and Musukaev
At the end of the 57 kg quarterfinal wrestling match between Lebedev and Musukaev the referees awarded the victory to Viktor Lebedev. However, after the match the Russian Championships wrestling commission considered mistakes of the referee and awarded the victory to Ismail Musukaev (4-2). Even so, Lebedev remained in the semifinals.

After the incident, the  Dagestani team walked out, along with others, including many Chechens.

In the 57 kg final, following another controversial victory for Lebedev over Aleksandr Bogomoev, the commission decided award gold medals to both.

Medal overview

Medal table

Men's freestyle

See also 

2015 Russian National Freestyle Wrestling Championships
2017 Russian National Freestyle Wrestling Championships
2015 Russian National Greco-Roman Wrestling Championships
Soviet and Russian results in men's freestyle wrestling

References

External links 
 http://wrestrus.ru/turnirs/215
 http://www.championat.com/other/article-248582-anons-chempionata-rossii-po-volnoj-borbe-v-jakutske.html

 
Russian National Freestyle Wrestling Championships
National Freestyle Wrestling Championships
Russian National Freestyle Wrestling Championships
Sport in Yakutsk
National Freestyle Wrestling Championships